Anthony Chisholm  (April 9, 1943 – October 16, 2020) was an American actor.

Career
He was nominated for a Tony Award for Best Supporting Actor in a play, for his role of Elder Joseph Barlow in August Wilson's Radio Golf. He also performed on Broadway in August Wilson's Gem of the Ocean in the role of "Solly Two Kings", and Two Trains Running in the role of "Wolf".  He is a winner of both the Drama Desk Award and the Obie Award for August Wilson's Jitney, which enjoyed a ten-month run in New York City.  He is also the recipient of the NAACP Theatre Award, the AUDELCO Award, the Ovation Award, and the I.R.N.E. Award.

He also received nominations for the Drama Desk Awards (2), Drama League Award (1),  Joseph Jefferson Award (4), Ovation Award (4), NAACP Theatre Awards (2), and AUDELCO Award (2).

He performed internationally in the hit Vietnam play, Tracers, at The Seymour Center, Sydney, Australia; the Universal Theatre, Melbourne, Australia; The Royal Court Theatre, London, England.  He also performed Jitney at London's National Theatre on the South Bank winning the Olivier Award for Best New Play.

Chisholm played Burr Redding on the HBO television series Oz for three seasons. He appears in the films Premium Rush and Chi-Raq.

Personal life
He was born and grew up in Cleveland. Chisholm was drafted into the Army in 1964 and served as a platoon leader in Vietnam.

He married Valerie Moore in 1972 which ended in divorce. Chisholm married Gloria Nixon in 1979 which also ended in divorce.

Selected filmography
Uptight (film) (1968) (Uncredited) (First role)
(Putney Swope (1969) (Cowboy 3)
(Cotton Comes to Harlem) (1970) (Plain clothes man)
(Great Performances) (1974) (Servant to Cornwall) (King Lear)
(Death of a Prophet) (1981) (As Tony Chisholm)
(New York Undercover (1996) (Freddy Wells) (Unis)
Beloved (1998 film) (Langhorne)
Third Watch (2001) (Eric) (Adam 55-3)
100 Centre Street (2002) (Wally Zane) (Zero Tolerance)
Law & Order: Special Victims Unit (2002) (Leroy Russell) (Execution)
Hack (TV series) (2002-03) (Big Elwood) (Songs in the Night, Black Eye)
Oz (TV series) (2001-03) (Burr Redding) 
The Handler (TV series) (2003) (Frederick Speed) (Under Color of Law)
Reign Over Me (2007) (William Johnson)
Blackout (2007 film) (Toothless Tone)
Entre nos (2009) (Joe)
13 (2010 film) (Mr. Gomez)
Detroit 1-8-7 (2010) (George) (Nobody's Home/Unknown Soldier)
Premium Rush (2012) (Tito)
Nasty Baby (2015) (Mo's father)
Condemned (2015 film) (Shynola)
Chi-Raq (2015) (Mr. Doctor Aesop)
Shades of Blue (TV series) (2016) (Moses) (What Devil Do)
Bakery in Brooklyn (2016) (Nathan)
Going in Style (2017 film) (Knights Grandmaster Paul)
High Maintenance (2018) (Mr. Chase) (Namaste)
Random Acts of Flyness (2018) (Uncle Ren/Old Man)
Wu-Tang: An American Saga (2019) (Old Chess Player)

References

External links

1943 births
2020 deaths
African-American male actors
American male film actors
Place of birth missing
Place of death missing
American male stage actors
American male television actors